The 57th National Film Awards, presented by Directorate of Film Festivals, the organisation set up by Ministry of Information and Broadcasting, India to felicitate the best of Indian Cinema released in the year 2009.

Three different committees were instituted in order to judge the various entries for feature film, non-feature film and best writing on cinema sections; headed by National award winner director, Ramesh Sippy, for feature films and Mike Pandey along with Samik Bandyopadhyay for non-feature films and best writing on cinema sections, respectively. Another committee of five members was also constituted for the Dadasaheb Phalke Award.

Each chairperson for feature film, non-feature film and best writing on cinema sections announced the award on 15 September 2010 for their respective sections and award ceremony took place at Vigyan Bhavan, New Delhi with President of India, Pratibha Patil giving away the awards on 22 October 2010.

Dadasaheb Phalke award for D. Ramanaidu was announced prior to the announcement of 57th National Film Awards on 9 September 2010.

With 57th National Film Awards, for feature film section, National Film Award for Best Screenplay, Best Audiography and Best Music Direction have been split into multiple awards to felicitate different aspect of the techniques. Best Screenplay would now cover Original and Adapted Screenplay along with Dialogues. National Film Award for Best Audiography have been sub-categorized into Location sound recordist, Sound designer and Re-recordist of the final mixed track; whereas Best Music Direction will be given for Songs and Background score, separately. All the awardee will be awarded with Rajat Kamal (Silver Lotus).

Awards 

Awards were divided into feature films, non-feature films and books written on Indian cinema.

Lifetime Achievement Award 

Lifetime achievement award is given to the prominent personality from the Indian film industry for the significant contributions given.

Juries 

A committee consisting five eminent personalities from Indian film industry was appointed to evaluate the lifetime achievement award, Dadasaheb Phalke Award. Following were the jury members:

 Jury Members
 Yash ChopraAkkineni Nageswara RaoJaved AkhtarJagjit SinghAsha Parekh

Feature films 

Films made in any Indian language shot on 16 mm, 35 mm or in a wider gauge or digital format but released on a film format or video/digital but certified by the Central Board of Film Certification as a feature film or featurette are eligible for Feature Film section.

A total of 20 films were awarded in this category at the National Awards. Feature films were awarded at All India as well as regional level. For 57th National Film Awards, a Malayalam film, Kutty Srank won the National Film Award for Best Feature Film also winning the maximum number of awards (5). Following were the awards given in each category:

Juries 

A committee headed by Ramesh Sippy was appointed to evaluate the feature films awards. The selection process returned to a Two Tier System of Selection. The Chairperson for the Northern Region was Sushma Seth, for the Western Region, M. S. Sathyu, for South–I Region, T. S. Nagabharana, for the Eastern Region, B. Lenin and for South- II Region, Pinaki Chaudhari. Following were the jury members:

 Jury Members
 Ramesh Sippy (Chairperson)M. S. SathyuT. S. NagabharanaPinaki ChaudhuriB. Lenin
 Sushma SethBhanu AthaiyaMaithili RaoHari KumarFeroz Abbas KhanSarosh Italiaa
 Jury Regional : North
 Sushma SethBirendra Nath TiwariRama VijSaryu V. DoshiApurwa Yagnik
 Jury Regional : West
 M. S. SathyuRamdas PhutaneRanjeetKuldip SudFowzia Fathima
 Jury Regional : South-I (Tamil and Malayalam)
 T. S. NagabharanaAgathiyanR. SarathSanjeev SivanPrem Sagar
 Jury Regional : South-II (Kannada and Telugu)
 Pinaki ChaudhuriChandrasiddarthV. N. LaxminarayanaSuresh KrishnaPrabodh Parikh
 Jury Regional : East
 B. LeninMakhonmani MongsabaAniruddha Roy ChowdhuryVidya Rao NairJeroo Mulla

All India Award 

Following were the awards given:

Golden Lotus Award 

Official Name: Swarna Kamal

All the awardees are awarded with 'Golden Lotus Award (Swarna Kamal)', a certificate and cash prize.

Silver Lotus Award 

Official Name: Rajat Kamal

All the awardees are awarded with 'Silver Lotus Award (Rajat Kamal)', a certificate and cash prize.

Regional Awards 

The award is given to best film in the regional languages in India.

Non-Feature Films 

Films made in any Indian language shot on 16 mm, 35 mm or in a wider gauge or digital format and released on either film format or video/digital but certified by the Central Board of Film Certification as a documentary/newsreel/fiction are eligible for non-feature film section.

A total of 11 films were awarded in the non-feature film category at the 57th National Film Awards. Gaarud and In Camera, both received the maximum number of awards, two.

Juries 

A committee headed by Mike Pandey was appointed to evaluate the non-feature films awards. Following were the jury members:

 Jury Members
 Mike Pandey (Chairperson)M. R. RajanJoy Bimal RoyVibhu PuriRajesh JalaBani Prakash DasMaya Jaideep

Golden Lotus Award 

Official Name: Swarna Kamal

All the awardees are awarded with 'Golden Lotus Award (Swarna Kamal)', a certificate and cash prize.

Silver Lotus Award 

Official Name: Rajat Kamal

All the awardees are awarded with 'Silver Lotus Award (Rajat Kamal)' and cash prize.

Best Writing on Cinema 

The awards aim at encouraging study and appreciation of cinema as an art form and dissemination of information and critical appreciation of this art-form through publication of books, articles, reviews etc.

Juries 

A committee headed by Samik Bandyopadhyay was appointed to evaluate the writing on Indian cinema. Following were the jury members:

 Jury Members
 Samik Bandyopadhyay (Chairperson)R. K. Bidur SinghSharad Dutt

Golden Lotus Award 

Official Name: Swarna Kamal

All the awardees are awarded with 'Golden Lotus Award (Swarna Kamal)' and cash prize.

Special Mention 

All the award winners are awarded with Certificate of Merit.

Awards not given 

Following were the awards not given as no film was found to be suitable for the award:

 Best Animated Film
 Best Film on Family Welfare
 Best Film on Environment / Conservation / Preservation
 Best Feature Film in Manipuri (Meitei)
 Best Feature Film in Oriya
 Best Feature Film in Punjabi
 Best Feature Film in Telugu
 Best Feature Film in English
 Best Non-Feature Film Direction
 Best Anthropological / Ethnographic Film
 Best Arts / Cultural Film
 Best Scientific Film
 Best Promotional Film
 Best Educational / Motivational / Instructional Film
 Best Exploration / Adventure Film
 Best Investigative Film
 Best Animation Film
 Best Non-feature Film on Family Welfare
 Best Music Direction

References

External links 
 National Film Awards Archives
 Official Page for Directorate of Film Festivals, India

National Film Awards (India) ceremonies
2010 Indian film awards